The 20th Annual Japan Record Awards took place at the Imperial Garden Theater in Chiyoda, Tokyo, on December 31, 1978, starting at 7:00PM JST. The primary ceremonies were televised in Japan on TBS.

Winners

Japan Record Award
Pink Lady – "UFO"
Lyrics: Yū Aku
Music and arrangement: Shunichi Tokura
Record Company: JVC Victor

Best Vocalist
Kenji Sawada

Best New Artist
Machiko Watanabe

Gold Award
Naoko Ken – "Kamome wa Kamome"
Goro Noguchi – "Good Luck"
Junko Sakurada – "Shiawase Shibai"
Hiromi Iwasaki – "Cinderella Honeymoon"
Junko Ohashi – "Tasogare My Love"
Aki Yashiro – "Kokyō e..."
Hideki Saijo – "Blue Sky Blue"
Momoe Yamaguchi – "Playback Part 2"
Pink Lady – "UFO"
Kenji Sawada – "Love (Dakishimetai)"

Newcomer Award
Mako Ishino – "Shitsuren Kinenbi"
Muneyuki Satō – "Aoba Jōkoi Uta"
Teppei Shibuya – "Deep"
Rie Nakahara – "Kamome ga Tonda hi"
Masanori Sera & Twist – "Hikigane" (Declined)

Shinpei Nakayama Award (Composition Award)
Mayo Shōno – "Tonde Istanbul" / Rie Nakahara – "Tokyo Lullaby"
Composer: Kyōhei Tsutsumi

Arrangement Award
Circus – "Mr. Summertime"
Arrangement: Norio Maeda

Yaso Saijō Award (Lyrics Award)
Tokiko Kato – "Kono Sora wo Tobetara" / Junko Sakurada – "Shiawase Shibai"
Lyrics: Miyuki Nakajima

Special Award
Noriko Awaya
Masato Fujita
Teichiku Records

External links
Official Website

Japan Record Awards
Japan Record Awards
Japan Record Awards
Japan Record Awards
1978